SWAT Force is the first game of the Police Quest series to be released for mobiles, developed by French studio Kaolink. The player controls a two-man team (sharp shooter and demolition expert) and tries to rescue hostages, arrest suspects and secure weapons. It was released February 28, 2006.

Gameplay
The player controls a two-person SWAT team consisting of an artilleryman and an expert. The expert is able to pick locks, hack computers and defuse bombs, while the artilleryman is equipped with a more lethal weapon as well as stun grenades, flashbang grenades and the ability to get enemies to surrender.

Reception

The game received "average" reviews according to the review aggregation website GameRankings.

References

External links
 Vivendi Universal's SWAT Force Official Site

2006 video games
Mobile games
Police Quest and SWAT
Shoot 'em ups
Video games about police officers
Video games developed in France